Stomorhina (often misspelled as "Stomorrhina") is a genus of flies in the family Rhiniidae.

Species
Stomorhina apta Curran, 1931
Stomorhina chapini Curran, 1931
Stomorhina discolor (Fabricius, 1794)
Stomorhina guttata Villeneuve, 1914
Stomorhina lilitha Lehrer, 2007
Stomorhina lunata (Fabricius, 1805)
Stomorhina mulanjenia Lehrer, 2007
Stomorhina neali Kurahashi & Magpayo, 2000
Stomorhina norrisi Dear, 1977
Stomorhina obsoleta (Wiedemann, 1830)
Stomorhina townsendi Kurahashi, 1997
Stomorhina veterana Villeneuve, 1927
Stomorhina xanthogaster (Wiedemann, 1820)

References 

Muscomorph flies of Europe
Diptera of Africa
Articles containing video clips
Oestroidea genera
Taxa named by Camillo Rondani
Rhiniidae